USS Cobbler (SS-344), a , was a ship of the United States Navy named for the cobbler, the killifish of New South Wales.

Cobbler (SS-344) was launched 1 April 1945 by Electric Boat Co., Groton, Connecticut; sponsored by Mrs. J. B. Rutter; commissioned 8 August 1945.

Cobbler arrived at Key West 11 January 1946, for operations locally and in the Caribbean for exercises and training until 27 November 1948. She then sailed for Groton, arriving 1 December for a GUPPY II modernization being completed on 17 August 1949. She departed Groton 24 August for Norfolk, her home port from the time of her arrival, 27 August.

She conducted operations in Florida and Caribbean waters and along the east coast visiting Quebec 10 to 14 September 1953, and returning to Norfolk 19 September. On 27 March 1954 she cleared Norfolk for 3 weeks of operations under the control of the Operational Development Force, cruising with units of the Canadian navy and air force from Bermuda to Nova Scotia.

Her operations in the Caribbean and off the east coast continued, until 6 January 1958, when she departed Norfolk for a tour of duty in the Mediterranean Sea, returning 18 April. She resumed operations off the east coast, cruising to Bermuda in June 1958, and to Quebec with midshipmen embarked in July 1959. From 9 September 1959 through 1960 she was assigned to the Atlantic Fleet's Antisubmarine Development Force.

In 1962, Cobbler became one of only nine boats to undergo the GUPPY III conversion. She had a  hull extension added forward of the control room, a plastic sail and the BQG-4 PUFFS passive ranging sonar, which included the three sharkfin sensors on her deck.

TCG Çanakkale (S 341) 

Both submarines were handed over on 21 March 1973 in New London. Cobbler was renamed TCG Çanakkale  (S 341), the second submarine of that name. She was formally decommissioned, struck from the US Naval Register, and sold, 28 November 1973. Arriving in Turkey on 15 January 1974 she was commissioned on 12 February 1974. She was finally decommissioned on 22 January 1998.

References

External links 

History of Turkish Submarines (1948-1972)

Balao-class submarines
Ships built in Groton, Connecticut
1945 ships
World War II submarines of the United States
Cold War submarines of the United States
Ships transferred from the United States Navy to the Turkish Navy
Balao-class submarines of the Turkish Navy